Larry Beil (born ) is an American sportscaster.

Biography
From 1996 to 1998, he was an anchor on SportsCenter, the flagship program of ESPN. Beil, who graduated from the University of Hawaii, introduced a new catch phrase after showing a home run: "Aloha means goodbye." He also appeared in a This is SportsCenter ad in which he was introduced by ring announcer Michael Buffer, as if he were about to compete in a boxing match. After leaving ESPN, Beil became the sports director at KGO-TV, the ABC O&O in San Francisco. He is also a sports columnist for Yahoo! and hosts a Yahoo! webcast with former Seattle Seahawk Joe Nash called SportStream. Prior to his work at ESPN, he was sports anchor and reporter at KTVU Channel 2 in Oakland and KGMB Channel 9 in Honolulu, Hawaii. Beil re-joined ESPN as a guest anchor for SportsCenter on August 3, 2016, June 20, 2017 and August 2, 2017.

In 2019, he began hosting the weekly podcast With Authority alongside Casey Pratt.

References

Year of birth missing (living people)
Television anchors from San Francisco
Living people
University of Hawaiʻi alumni
People from the Bronx
Place of birth missing (living people)
Journalists from New York City
Sportswriters from New York (state)